Neet Mohan (born 11 November 1985) is an English actor, known for his role as PC Taz Ahmed on the Channel 4 series No Offence (2017) and  Dr. Rash Masum on the BBC medical drama Casualty (2017–present).

Career
In 2012, Mohan joined the cast of Line of Duty in the role of PC Simon Bannerjee. From 2015 to 2017, he played PC Taz Ahmed on the Channel 4 television series No Offence. Then in 2017, Mohan began portraying the role of Dr. Rash Masum in the BBC medical drama Casualty. He also portrayed Rash in an episode of Holby City.

Filmography

Awards and nominations

References

External links
 

1985 births
21st-century English male actors
English male film actors
English male stage actors
English male television actors
Living people
English people of Indian descent
British male actors of Indian descent